The 2002–03 season of the Venezuelan Primera División, the top category of Venezuelan football, was played by 10 teams. The national champions were Caracas.

Torneo Apertura

Torneo Clausura

Final Playoff

Promotion/relegation playoff

External links
Venezuela 2002-03 season at RSSSF

Venezuelan Primera División seasons
Ven
Ven
2002–03 in Venezuelan football